John Jones (10 May 1899 – 14 March 1991) was an Australian cricketer. He played ten first-class matches for Western Australia between 1933/34 and 1935/36.

See also
 List of Western Australia first-class cricketers

References

External links
 

1899 births
1991 deaths
Australian cricketers
Western Australia cricketers
Cricketers from Melbourne